Benjamin Wierman House, also known as the Gorman Lloyd House and Snapp House, is a historic home located near Quicksburg, Shenandoah County, Virginia. It was built in 1859, and is a two-story, frame I-house dwelling in the Greek Revival style. It sits on an English basement.  The house features a long set of new wooden steps that lead up to a small front portico and massive cut limestone chimneys.  Also on the property are the contributing one-story frame spring house with a loft, a small meat house, a frame chicken house, and a horse barn site.

It was listed on the National Register of Historic Places in 2008.

References

Houses on the National Register of Historic Places in Virginia
Greek Revival houses in Virginia
Houses completed in 1859
Houses in Shenandoah County, Virginia
National Register of Historic Places in Shenandoah County, Virginia